China National Highway 109 connects Beijing with Lhasa. It runs westwards from Beijing via Datong, Yinchuan and Xining to Golmud before turning southwest to Lhasa. The portion of the highway from Xining to Lhasa is known as the Qinghai-Tibet Highway. The total length of the route is 3,901 km.

Fushi Road or Jinglan Road forms the stretch of G109 in Beijing, as it begins from Fuchengmen and traverses through Shijingshan. The majority of the Beijing section is in Mentougou District.

The section of the highway within western Qinghai and Tibet, from Golmud to Lhasa, is paralleled by the Qinghai-Tibet Railway. Construction of this section started on 11 May 1954.
"Tasked with carrying upwards of 85 per cent of goods in and out of Tibet, the Qinghai-Tibet Highway has been dubbed the "Lifeline of Tibet." ... Since it was opened to traffic in 1954, the central government has spent nearly 3 billion yuan (US$362 million) on three major overhauls. It was asphalted in 1985."The route also holds importance as one of the main coal transport routes in southern Inner Mongolia.

Route and distance

See also

 China National Highways
 AH42

References

109
Road transport in Beijing
Transport in Hebei
Transport in Shanxi
Transport in Inner Mongolia
Transport in Ningxia
Transport in Gansu
Transport in Qinghai
Roads in Tibet
Transport in Lhasa